The Japanese political process has three types of elections.

 held every four years (unless the lower house is dissolved earlier).

 held every three years to choose half of its members.

 held every four years for offices in prefectures and municipalities.

Elections are supervised by Election Administration Commissions at each administrative level under the general direction of the Central Election Management Council, an extraordinary organ attached to the Ministry of Internal Affairs and Communications (MIC). The minimum voting age in Japan's non-compulsory electoral system was reduced from twenty to eighteen years in June 2016. Voters must satisfy a three-month residency requirement before being allowed to cast a ballot.

For those seeking offices, there are two sets of age requirements: twenty-five years of age for admission to the House of Representatives and most local offices, and thirty years of age for admission to the House of Councillors and the prefectural governorship. Each deposit for candidacy for national election is 3 million yen (about 27 thousand dollars) for a single-seat constituency and 6 million yen (about 54 thousand dollars) for proportional representation.

National elections
 The  has 465 members, elected for a rarely completed four-year term, 289 members in single-seat constituencies and 176 members by proportional representation in 11 regional "block" constituencies.

 are usually held before the end of a four-year term as the chamber may be dissolved by the cabinet via the Emperor. Most prime ministers use that option. The only exception in post-war history was the "Lockheed Election" of 1976 in which the Liberal Democratic Party lost its seat majority for the first time.

The single-seat constituencies are decided by plurality, and the proportional seats are handed out in each "block" constituency to party lists proportionally (by the D'Hondt method) to their share of the vote. Each voter votes twice, once for a candidate in the local constituency, and once for a party in the regional "block" constituency. In a parallel system, there is no link between votes in one tier and seat numbers in the other; but so-called  of one candidate in both tiers simultaneously are allowed. If such dual candidates lose in the majoritarian tier, they still have a chance to be elected in the proportional block. Parties may also place dual district and block candidates on the same list rank; in that case, the  system determines the order of candidates.

 The  has 245 members (248 from 2022), elected for a fixed six-year term, 147 (2022–: 148) members by single non-transferable vote (SNTV) in 45 single- and multi-seat constituencies (most are prefectures, two combined constituencies comprise two neighbouring prefectures each) and 98 (2022–: 100) by proportional representation (by D'Hondt method) with optionally open lists in a single, nationwide constituency.

 are usually held once every three years. In staggered elections, half of the House of Councillors comes up for election every three years in elections. The term is fixed, the House of Councillors cannot be dissolved. This, too, is a parallel electoral system. Dual candidacies are not allowed. As in House of Representatives elections, voters have two votes: In the majoritarian election, the vote has to be for a candidate, but in the proportional election, the vote may be for either a party list or a single candidate; in the latter case, the vote counts as both a vote for the party list (to determine proportional seat distribution), and as a preference vote within that list (to determine the order or proportional candidates within that list). The district magnitudes in the majoritarian tier vary between one and six, dependent on, but not fully proportional to the population of each prefecture. In single-member constituencies, SNTV becomes equivalent to first-past-the-post, whereas seats are usually split between different parties/alliances in multi-member constituencies (and in the proportional constituency by definition). The proportional election to the House of Councillors allows the voters to cast a preference vote for a single candidate on a party list. The preference votes strictly determined the ranking of candidates on party lists before 2019. In the 2019 election, almost all parties continued to use completely open lists; exceptions were the LDP which used the "special frame" to give secure list spots to two LDP prefectural federations affected by the introduction of combined constituencies in 2016, Reiwa Shinsengumi which used it to give secure list spots to two candidates with severe disabilities, and the minor "Labourers' Party for the liberation of labour".

The electoral cycles of the two chambers of the Diet are usually not synchronized. Even when the current constitution took effect in 1947, the first House of Councillors election was held several days apart from the 23rd House of Representatives election. Only in 1980 and 1986, general and regular election coincided on the same day because the House of Representatives was dissolved in time for the election to be scheduled together with the House of Councillors election in early summer.

Nowadays, these are usually scheduled in April and October as necessary. Vacant proportional seats in both Houses and district seats in the House of Councillors that fall vacant within three months of a regular election are filled by : the highest ranking candidate on a proportional list or in the electoral district who was not elected and is not disqualified takes the seat. Disqualifications may, for example, happen if a candidate for the House of Councillors runs for the House of Representatives or vice versa, or after a violation of campaign laws.

It won a majority of the popular vote in House of Representatives general elections until the 1960s. It lost the majority of seats in 1976 and 1979, but continued to rule without coalition partners with the support of independent Representatives. In 1986, the coalition ended as the LDP won a large majority of seats and even came close to a majority of votes. The party suffered its first clear electoral defeat in the 1989 House of Councillors regular election when it lost the upper house majority and had to face for the first time a  where passing legislation depends on cooperation with the opposition.

According to a survey by Yomiuri Shimbun in April 2010, almost half of Japanese voters do not support any political parties due to political inefficiency.

Election of the Prime Minister
Between 1885 and 1947 in the Empire of Japan, the prime minister was not elected by legisture, but responsible to, chosen and appointed by the Emperor. In practice, the  usually nominated a candidate for appointment. The  and its elected lower house, the House of Representatives, which were set up in 1890 according to the Imperial Constitution, had no constitutionally guaranteed role in the formation of cabinets.

It is held after a cabinet has submitted its resignation – the outgoing cabinet remains as caretaker cabinet until the Imperial inauguration ceremony of a new prime minister –; a cabinet must resign en masse under the constitution (Articles 69 and 70) 1. always on convocation of the first Diet after a general election of the House of Representatives, 2. if the post of prime minister has fallen vacant – that includes cases when the prime minister is permanently incapacitated, e.g. by illness, kidnapping or defection –, or 3. if a no-confidence vote in the House of Representatives is not answered by the dissolution of the chamber. Though both Houses of the Diet vote in two-round elections to select a prime minister, the House of Representatives has the decisive vote: If the two Houses vote for different candidates (as they did in 1948, 1989, 1998, 2007 and 2008), a procedure in the  may reach a consensus; but eventually the candidate of the House of Representatives becomes that of the whole Diet and thereby prime minister-designate.

In 2001, LDP president and Prime Minister Junichirō Koizumi instituted an advisory council to investigate the possibility of introducing direct popular election of the prime minister in a constitutional revision.

Upcoming national elections

2022 House of Councillors by-election 
On April 24, a by-election will be held in Ishikawa to the 2019–25 class of the House of Councillors. The seat had been vacated in December 2021 by Shūji Yamada (LDP) for his (unsuccessful) candidacy in the gubernatorial election in March. There are also two vacant House of Councillors seats in Kanagawa (one from each class), but they will be filled in a single, combined regular and by-election in Summer.

2022 House of Councillors regular election 

The 2022 electoral map sees the LDP looking to defend or expand on the slightly stronger class of its House of Councillors caucus with 57 (as of February 2022) of its 110 seats up, including defected ex-Democrats in Miyagi and Fukushima. The centre-left opposition will seek to defend single-member seats in "purple" prefectures like Nagano or Yamanashi while trying to make inroads into "red" territory as it had done to some degree with the joint centre-left strategy in the 2019 election when it recovered somewhat from the 2013 wipe-out in single-member districts and gained some seats even in conservative-leaning prefectures (Akita, Yamagata, Ehime). However, depending on the outcome of the April by-election and other party changes until then, the ruling parties would have to lose at least 14 seats overall to lose their majority, even more to give unambiguous control to the opposition.

Latest results

2021 House of Representatives general election 

The LDP defended its majority, and the LDP-Kōmeitō coalition government continues under prime minister Fumio Kishida; but the coalition no longer holds a two-thirds majority as it had previously since 2012, i.e. it now needs to retain its majority in the House of Councillors in order to control a legislative majority of its own in parliament. The main opposition CDP picked up some majoritarian seats in a joint centre-left nomination strategy, but lost substantially in the proportional tier where it had held almost the same number of seats as the LDP before the election due to the 2020 party realignments. The centre-right opposition Ishin no Kai surged, winning 15 of 19 FPTP seats in Osaka and gaining seats in ten of eleven proportional districts countrywide.

 Proportional tier (11 constituencies, 176 seats), turnout 55.92%
 LDP 59 PR-only + 251 dual candidates, 34.7% of votes, 72 seats (41% of seats)
 CDP 26+213 candidates, 20.0%, 39 seats (22%)
 Ishin 2+94 candidates, 14.0%, 25 seats (14%)
 Komeito 44+0 candidates, 12.4%, 23 seats (13%)
 JCP 25+15 candidates, 7.2%, 9 seats (5%)
 DPFP 6+21 candidates, 4.5%, 5 seats (3%)
 Reiwa Shinsengumi 9+12 candidates, 3.9%, 3 seats (2%)
 6 other parties (aggregate) 40 candidates, 3.4%, no seats
 Majoritarian tier (289 constituencies, 289 seats), turnout 55.93%
 Governing parties (LDP+Komeito): 286 candidates (cross-endorsed practically countrywide), 49.6 % of votes, 196 seats (67.8% of seats)
 Centre-left opposition (CDP+DPFP+JCP+SDP+ReiShin): 361 candidates (joint in about two-thirds of constituencies, competing against each other in the rest), 37.7 %, 65 seats (22.5%)
 Ishin: 94 candidates, 8.4%, 16 seats (5.5%)
 Independents: 80 candidates (including several endorsed by the LDP) 3.9 %, 12 seats (4.2%, including two winners retroactively nominated by the LDP)
 Others (aggregate) 36 candidates, 0.4 %, no seats

2021 House of Councillors by-elections 
One week before the 2021 House of Representatives general election, by-elections to the House of Councillors were held in Yamaguchi and Shizuoka. Former proportional district member Tsuneo Kitamura (LDP – Kōmeitō) easily held conservative stronghold Yamaguchi for the ruling coalition against candidates from JCP and [anti-]NHK party, former prefectural assembly member Shinnosuke Yamazaki (independent – CDP, DPFP) narrowly won Shizuoka for the centre-left opposition against candidates from LDP and JCP.

2021 by- & repeat elections to both houses 
The centre-left opposition won all three April 2021 elections to the Diet:
 In the repeat election to the House of Councillors in Hiroshima following the invalidation of Anri Kawai's 2019 election, opposition-supported announcer Haruko Miyaguchi (I/O – CDP, DPFP, SDP) defeated former METI bureaucrat Hidenori Nishita (LDP – Kōmeitō).
 In the Nagano by-election to the House of Councillors, Jirō Hata (CDP – JCP, DPFP, SDP) beat former H.R. member Yutaka Komatsu (LDP – Kōmeitō) to fill his late brother's seat.
 In the Hokkaidō 2 by-election to the House of Representatives caused by the resignation of Takamori Yoshikawa (LDP) for health reasons during the Akita Foods scandal, former member Kenkō Matsuki (CDP – DPFP, SDP) won safely with 43,7 % of the vote against a field of several independent/third-pillar candidates, the ruling parties did not contest the race directly and endorsed no candidate.

2020 House of Representatives by-election
The 26 April by-election in Shizuoka's 4th district was won by former prefectural assemblyman Yōichi Fukazawa (LDP – Kōmeitō). With 61% of the vote, he easily beat opposition candidate Ken Tanaka (I – CDP, DPFP, JCP, SDP; 35%), a former prefectural assembly member from Tokyo, and two other candidates to fill the seat vacated by Yoshio Mochizuki's death in December.

2019 House of Councillors by-election
The 27 October by-election in Saitama to fill the vacancy created by Motohiro Ōno's (DPFP) resignation was won by previous governor and former DPJ House of Representatives member Kiyoshi Ueda who had been an independent since his move from national to prefectural politics in 2003. The only other candidate was Takashi Tachibana for the anti-NHK party.

2019 House of Councillors regular election

Results summary:
 Proportional tier (1 nationwide constituency, 50 seats), turnout 48.79%
 LDP 33 candidates, 35.4% of votes, 19 seats (38% of seats)
 CDP 22 candidates, 15.8%, 8 seats (16%)
 Komeito 17 candidates, 13.1%, 7 seats (14%)
 Ishin 14 candidates, 9.8%, 5 seats (10%)
 JCP 26 candidates, 9.0%, 4 seats (8%)
 DPFP 14 candidates, 7.0%, 3 seats (6%)
 Reiwa Shinsengumi 9 candidates, 4.6%, 2 seats (4%) and gained legal status as national-level political party (>2% of votes)
 SDP 4 candidates, 2.1%, 1 seat (2%)
 N-Koku 4 candidates, 1.97%, 1 seat (2%)
 4 other parties (aggregate) 12 candidates, 1.4%, no seats
 Majoritarian tier (45 constituencies, 74 seats), turnout 48.80%
 Governing parties (LDP+Komeito): 56 candidates, 47.5 % of votes, 45 seats (60.8% of seats)
 Centre-left opposition (CDP+DPFP+JCP+SDP): 51 candidates, 30.0 %, 15 seats (20.3%)
 Independents: 31 candidates (many of them jointly supported by the centre-left alliance in single-member constituencies) 10.6 %, 9 seats (12.2%, all of them centre-left opposition)
 Ishin: 8 candidates, 7.3%, 5 seats (6.8%)
 N-Koku: 37 candidates, 3.0%, no seats, but gained legal party status
 Others (aggregate: Reiwa Shinsengumi & 5 other parties) 32 candidates, 1.6 %, no seats

List of House of Representatives general elections

19th century

20th century

21st century

List of House of Councillors regular elections

20th century 
1947 Japanese House of Councillors election
1950 Japanese House of Councillors election
1953 Japanese House of Councillors election
1956 Japanese House of Councillors election
1959 Japanese House of Councillors election
1962 Japanese House of Councillors election
1965 Japanese House of Councillors election
1968 Japanese House of Councillors election
1971 Japanese House of Councillors election
1974 Japanese House of Councillors election
1977 Japanese House of Councillors election
1980 Japanese House of Councillors election
1983 Japanese House of Councillors election
1986 Japanese House of Councillors election
1989 Japanese House of Councillors election
1992 Japanese House of Councillors election
1995 Japanese House of Councillors election
1998 Japanese House of Councillors election

21st century 
2001 Japanese House of Councillors election
2004 Japanese House of Councillors election
2007 Japanese House of Councillors election
2010 Japanese House of Councillors election
2013 Japanese House of Councillors election 
2016 Japanese House of Councillors election
2019 Japanese House of Councillors election
2022 Japanese House of Councillors election

Malapportionment
In the 1980s, apportionment of electoral districts still reflected the distribution of the population in the years following World War II, when only one-third of the people lived in urban areas and two thirds lived in rural areas. In the next forty-five years, the population became more than three-quarters urban, as people deserted rural communities to seek economic opportunities in Tokyo and other large cities. The lack of reapportionment led to a serious underrepresentation of urban voters. Urban districts in the House of Representatives were increased by five in 1964, bringing nineteen new representatives to the lower house; in 1975 six more urban districts were established, with a total of twenty new representatives allocated to them and to other urban districts. Yet great inequities remained between urban and rural voters.

In the early 1980s, as many as five times the votes were needed to elect a representative from an urban district compared with those needed for a rural district. Similar disparities existed in the prefectural constituencies of the House of Councillors. The Supreme Court had ruled on several occasions that the imbalance violated the constitutional principle of one person-one vote. The Supreme Court mandated the addition of eight representatives to urban districts and the removal of seven from rural districts in 1986. Several lower house districts' boundaries were redrawn. Yet the disparity was still as much as three urban votes to one rural vote.

After the 1986 change, the average number of persons per lower house representative was 236,424. However, the figure varied from 427,761 persons per representative in the fourth district of Kanagawa Prefecture, which contains the large city of Yokohama, to 142,932 persons in the third district of largely rural and mountainous Nagano Prefecture.

The 1993 reform government under Hosokawa Morihiro introduce a new electoral system whereby 200 members (reduced to 180 beginning with the 2000 election) are elected by proportional representation in multi-member districts or "blocs" while 300 are elected from single-candidate districts.

Still, according to the 6 October 2006 issue of the Japanese newspaper Daily Yomiuri, "the Supreme Court followed legal precedent in ruling Wednesday that the House of Councillors election in 2004 was held in a constitutionally sound way despite a 5.13-fold disparity in the weight of votes between the nation's most densely and most sparsely populated electoral districts".

The 2009 general House of Representatives election was the first unconstitutional lower house election under the current electoral system introduced in 1994 (parallel voting and "small" FPTP single-member electoral districts/"Kakumander"). In March 2011, the Grand Bench (daihōtei) of the Supreme Court ruled that the maximum discrepancy of 2.30 in voting weight between the Kōchi 3 and Chiba 4 constituencies in the 2009 election was in violation of the constitutionally guaranteed equality of all voters. As in previous such rulings on unconstitutional elections (1972, 1980, 1983 and 1990 Representatives elections, 1992 Councillors election), the election is not invalidated, but the imbalance has to be corrected by the Diet through redistricting and/or reapportionment of seats between prefectures.

In 2016, a panel of experts proposed to introduce the [John Quincy] Adams apportionment method (method of smallest divisors) for apportioning House of Representatives seats to prefectures. The reform is planned to be implemented after the 2020 census figures are available and not expected to take effect before 2022. In the meantime, another redistricting and apportionment passed in 2017 is designed to keep the maximum malapportionment ratio in the House of Representatives below 2. In the FPTP tier, it changes 97 districts and cuts six without adding any; in the proportional tier, four "blocks" lose a seat each; the total number of seats in the lower house is cut to 465, 289 majoritarian seats and 176 proportional seats.

The malapportionment in the 2010 and 2013 regular House of Councillors elections was ruled unconstitutional (or "in an unconstitutional state") by the Supreme Court, and has been reduced by a 2015 reapportionment below 3 (at least in government statistics from census data which is regular and standardized but lags behind resident registration statistics and the actual number of eligible voters; using the latter, the maximum malapportionment in the 2016 election remained slightly above 3).

The following table lists the 10 electoral districts with the highest and lowest number of registered voters per member elected for each chamber of the National Diet according to the voter statistics as of September 2016 released by the Ministry of Internal Affairs and Communications – it takes into account the lowering of the voting age and the district reforms to both houses of the Diet in effect since the 2014 and 2016 elections, but not the 2017 redistricting/reapportionment effective from the next House of Representatives election.

Prefectural and local elections
Unified local elections (統一地方選挙 tōitsu chihō senkyo) are held once every four years. Prefectural assemblies and governors, as well as mayors and assemblies in municipalities, are elected for four-year terms. In April 1947, all local elections in the 46 prefectures (excluding Okinawa, then under US military rule) and all their municipalities were held at the same time in "unified local elections". Since then, some gubernatorial and mayoral elections, and most assembly elections, have stayed on this original four-year cycle. Most governors and mayors are now elected on different schedules as the four-year cycle "resets" upon the resignation, death or removal of a sitting governor or mayor. Some assembly election cycles have also shifted due to assembly dissolutions or mergers of municipalities. The most recent were the 2019 Japanese unified local elections.

Types of Japanese local elections 
Administrative divisions of Japan; 47 prefectures, 792 cities, 743 towns, 183 villages (not inducing the six villages in the Kuril Islands dispute area) and 23 special wards of Tokyo.

 Governor and mayor elections
 Prefectural governor elections (都道府県知事選挙 to-dō-fu-ken chiji senkyo)
 Municipal mayor elections (市町村長選挙 shi-chō-son chō senkyo)
 Special ward mayor elections (特別区長選挙 tokubetsu-ku chō senkyo)
 Prefectural and municipal assembly elections
 Prefectural assembly elections (都道府県議会議員選挙 to-dō-fu-ken gikaigiin senkyo) 
 Municipal assembly elections (市町村議会議員選挙 shi-chō-son gikaigiin senkyo) 
 Special ward assembly elections (特別区議会議員選挙 tokubetsu-ku gikaigiin senkyo)

Unified elections

As of 2015, the major contests in the unified local elections are as follows:

Although Tokyo's metropolitan governor and assembly elections are currently held on separate schedules, 21 of the 23 special wards of Tokyo follow the unified election schedule for their assembly elections, the only exceptions being Katsushika and Adachi. The majority of Tokyo's special wards follow separate cycles for their mayoral elections. Tokyo elected its governor as part of the unified elections until 2011, but was forced to hold a 2012 election and 2014 election due to the resignations of Shintaro Ishihara and Naoki Inose.

Iwate Prefecture, Miyagi Prefecture and Fukushima Prefecture are no longer on the unified election cycle due to the 2011 Tohoku earthquake and tsunami, which delayed their elections.

List of unified local elections
2007 Japanese unified local elections
2011 Japanese unified local elections
2015 Japanese unified local elections
2019 Japanese unified local elections

Other major local election cycles

 Since 1971, Ibaraki Prefecture has held its prefectural assembly elections in the December preceding the unified election, making this election a regular leading indicator of the nationwide elections in the following April. The 2014 Ibaraki election was held on the same day as the 2014 Japanese general election.
 Approximately 193 new municipalities were created in a wave of "Heisei mergers" effective in April 2005. Their first municipal elections were held around this time, and coincided with the Chiba and Akita gubernatorial elections and the Nagoya mayoral election, creating a second major local election cycle sometimes referred to as the "mini unified local elections."
 Okinawa Prefecture and most of its local governments continue to follow a four-year cycle that began following repatriation to Japan in June 1972, with several exceptions (including the city of Naha). Okinawa elections generally occur in the year following the unified elections; the next is scheduled for June 2016.

Ballots, voting machines and early voting

Votes in national and most local elections are cast by writing the candidate's or party's name on a blank ballot paper. In elections for the House of Representatives voters fill in two ballots, one with the name of their preferred district candidate and one with their preferred party in the proportional representation block. For the House of Councillors, the district vote is similar (in SNTV multi-member districts, several candidates can be elected, but every voter has only one vote). But in the proportional vote for the House of Councillors votes are cast for a party list (to determine how many proportional seats a party receives) or a candidate (which additionally influences which candidates are elected from a party's list).

Ballots that cannot unambiguously be assigned to a candidate are not considered invalid, but are assigned to all potentially intended candidates proportionally to the unambiguous votes each candidate has received. These so-called  are rounded to the third decimal. For example, if "Yamada A" and "Yamada B" both stood in an election and there were 1500 unambiguous votes: 1000 for "Yamada A" and 500 for "Yamada B"; five ambiguous votes for "Yamada" would then count for Yamada A as 5×1000/1500=3.333 votes, and for Yamada B as 5×500/1500=1.667 votes. The official overall result would then be: Yamada A 1003.333 votes, Yamada B 501.667 votes.

In 2002, passage of an electronic voting law allowed for the introduction of electronic voting machines in local elections. The first machine vote took place in Niimi, Okayama in June 2002. In the 2017 general/House of Representatives election, a record number of more than 21 million Japanese voted early; at the same time overall turnout was low (the second lowest in history), so in 2017, roughly 38 % of all actual voters had voted early. For regular/House of Councillors elections, the 2019 election set a new all-time high with more than 17 million early voters, corresponding to roughly a third of actual voters in 2019 as overall turnout hit the second lowest value in history.

Walkovers 
In Japan, walkovers in elections are called , "[being] elected without vote". And there is literally no vote held in a walkover in Japan, no way to vote "no" or abstain explicitly: If there are only as many candidates in an election as there are seats/offices at the start of the legal election period ("official announcement":  in national general and regular elections;  in prefectural and municipal elections as well as national by-elections), they are declared the winners. But the otherwise applicable moratorium period after regular elections on recall attempts does not apply after a walkover. (Recalls are a two-/three-step procedure: first, supporters of a recall must collect a sufficient number of signatures; if they do, a referendum is held on whether or not to recall the incumbent; only if that is accepted by a majority, a fresh election is scheduled.) Article 100 of the Public Offices Election Law deals with walkovers, there are additional walkover provisions for subnational elections in the Local Autonomy Law.

Walkovers have become widespread in prefectural and municipal elections in recent years; in the 2019 unified local elections, out of 2277 seats up in 945 electoral districts for 41 prefectural assemblies, a record 612 seats are won by walkovers in a total of 371 districts or 39% of all electoral districts. In one extreme case, a rural single-member electoral district to the Shimane prefectural assembly, there hasn't been a contested election in 31 years (the whole Heisei period).

See also
 Electoral calendar
 Election
 Political funding in Japan
 National Diet
 House of Representatives (Japan)
 House of Councillors (Japan)

References

External links
Adam Carr's Election Archive
Daily Yomiuri Online: Inequality at the polls must be corrected 
 MIC: Elections, political funds
Free Choice Foundation: Election system in Japan
NHKSenkyoWEB: monthly schedules of upcoming (national, prefectural and all municipal) elections (in Japanese)